Pseudotrigonogya is a genus of beetles in the family Buprestidae, containing the following species:

 Pseudotrigonogya ecuadorensis Manley, 1986
 Pseudotrigonogya insularis (Fisher, 1949)
 Pseudotrigonogya obscurinegro Manley, 1986
 Pseudotrigonogya valdenbroi Manley, 1986

References

Buprestidae genera